Gerald Melzer was the defending champion, but lost to Víctor Estrella Burgos in the semifinals. Estrella Burgos would go on to win the title defeating Damir Džumhur 7–5, 6–4 in the final.

Seeds

Draw

Finals

Top half

Bottom half

References
 Main Draw
 Qualifying Draw

Morelos Open - Singles